Aleksandr Sergeyevich Yerkin (born 1 September 1989) is a Russian professional football player. He plays for FC Yadro Saint Petersburg.

Club career
He played 5 seasons in the Russian Football National League for FC Shinnik Yaroslavl, FC Torpedo Moscow and FC Khimik Dzerzhinsk.

In 2020 season he played for Lithuanian FK Panevėžys. He played 23 matches in A Lyga and scored two goals. In January 2020 team announced, that he left Panevėžys.

He made his Russian Premier League debut for FC Tambov on 7 March 2021 in a game against FC Dynamo Moscow.

References

External links
 
 
 

1989 births
Footballers from Saint Petersburg
Living people
Russian footballers
Association football forwards
FC Shinnik Yaroslavl players
FC Torpedo Moscow players
FC Dynamo Saint Petersburg players
FK Panevėžys players
Russian expatriate footballers
Expatriate footballers in Lithuania
FC Khimik Dzerzhinsk players
FC Dynamo Bryansk players
FC Tambov players
Expatriate footballers in Latvia
Russian Premier League players
FC Olimp-Dolgoprudny players